Peter Boyle (born 27 May 1946) is an English film editor with more than 30 feature film credits. His work on the film The Hours (2002) was nominated for the Academy Award, the BAFTA Award, and the ACE Eddie, and other honors.

Boyle is a graduate of Bradfield College, and began his career working with director Richard Lester. After more than a decade of work as an assistant on feature films and editing commercials, his first credit as editor of a feature film was for McVicar in 1980. He has worked regularly on features and television films since then. From 1988 through 2006, Boyle edited five of the films directed by Kevin Reynolds.

Boyle has been elected as a member of the American Cinema Editors.

Boyle's editing of The Hours (directed by Stephen Daldry, 2002) was honored by numerous nominations for "best editing" of 2002 films. Critic Bob Grimm wrote that the film's editing "is a minor film miracle". Karen Pearlman selected the film as a case study for her 2016 book on film editing, Cutting Rhythms: Intuitive Film Editing.

Filmography
This filmography is based on the listing at the Internet Movie Database; the director of each film is listed in parenthesis.

References

Further reading
 Article about the editing of The Hours based on an interview with Boyle.

English film editors
American Cinema Editors
1946 births
Living people
People from Formby
American film editors